Elatia or Karantere ( or Καρά Ντερέ) is a mostly forested mountain area located in the central and northern parts of the Drama regional unit (and partially Kavala regional unit) in Greek Macedonia that extends along the Greek-Βulgarian border. Karantere is 90% covered by the forest of Elatia and contains the forest village of Elatia. The Forest of Elatia and Karantere are sometimes used interchangeably when describing the area.

The forest village of Elatia lies at the location known as "Koutra," 72 km from Drama, Greece. The forest is owned by the Greek Forest Service, with the village being the administrative and operational center for the Forest of Elatia.

Flora and fauna
Karantere contains the country's only forest of spruce trees. The landscape of the area is similar to that of central and northern Europe. Among the trees and plant life that can be found within the forest are:

There is a great wealth of plants in Elatia with more than 700 species. Many of which are endemic the Balkans and many of which are rare in Greece. A wide variety of mushrooms can be seen, many which are edible (Boletus, Amanita caesarea).

The fauna in the area has animal species such as the brown bear, wild boar, roe deer, hare, wolves, wild cat, wood pigeon, eagles, hawks, and woodpeckers, among others.

See also

 Elatia (Drama), Greece
 East Macedonia and Thrace
 Geography of Greece
 Western Thrace

References

Landforms of Drama (regional unit)
Mountains of Greece
Mountains of Eastern Macedonia and Thrace